Moti Chandra (1909–1974) was a distinguished Indian scholar, an art historian, and an author. He was a descendant of Bharatendu Harishchandra, the creator of modern Hindi prose, and was well known for his contributions to art history. He was from Varanasi.

Major works 

 "Trade And Trade Routes In Ancient India."
 "The World of Courtesans"
 "Mewar Painting in the Seventeenth Century"
 "Indian Art"
 "Stone Sculpture in the Prince of Wales Museum."
 "Kashi ka Itihas" (History of Kashi).
 "Costumes, Textiles, Cosmetics & Coiffure in Ancient and Mediaeval India"
 "The Golden Flute: Indian Painting and Poetry"
 "Jain Miniature Paintings from Western India"
 "Ikat Fabrics of Orissa and Andhra Pradesh (Study of Contemporary Textile Crafts of India)"
 "Indian Ivories"
 "New Documents of Jaina Painting"

See also 

 Kapisi

References 

Indian art historians
20th-century Indian male writers
Textile historians
1909 births
1974 deaths
Scholars from Varanasi